Acleris leechi is a species of moth of the family Tortricidae. It is found in Korea, China, Japan (Hokkaido, Honshu, Yokohama, Shikoku) and Russia (Ussuri, Vladivostok, eastern Siberia).

The wingspan is 13–17 mm.

The larvae feed on Quercus species.

References

Moths described in 1900
leechi
Moths of Asia